Portrait of Johanna de Geer and her Children as Charity or Portrait of Johanna de Geer and her Two Children Cecilia and Laurens Trip as Caritas is a c. 1664 oil on canvas painting by Ferdinand Bol, now in the collection of the Rijksmuseum, but hanging on long-term loan to the Koninklijke Nederlandse Akademie van Wetenschappen, also in Amsterdam.

History

It shows Joanna de Geer voor, second wife of the rich merchant Hendrik Trip, painted with her two children as Caritas

External links
 Catalogue entry - Rijksmuseum Amsterdam (as Caritas: Joanna de Geer (1629-1691) met haar kinderen Cecilia Trip (1660-1728) and Laurens Trip (born 1662), 1662-1669).
 RKDimages, kunstwerknummer 1896 (as Portrait of Johanna de Geer (1629-1691) with her children Cecilia Trip (1660-1728) and Laurens Trip (1662-?), represented as Caritas, ca. 1664).
 Bildindex der Kunst und Architektur (as Eine Mutter mit zwei Kindern und einem Hund, möglicherweise Johanna de Geer (1627-1691)).

Bibliography (in Dutch)
Anoniem (1903) Catalogus der Schilderijen miniaturen, pastels, omlijste teekeningen, enz. in het Rijks-Museum te Amsterdam, Amsterdam: Boek- en kunstdrukkerij v/h Roeloffzen-Hübner en Van Santen, p. 54, cat.nr. 547 (als Een Moeder met twee Kinderen en een Hondje). Zie archive.org.
Anoniem (1934) Catalogus der schilderijen pastels–miniaturen–aquarellen tentoongesteld in het Rijksmuseum te Amsterdam, Amsterdam: J.H. de Bussy, p. 53, cat.nr. 547 (als Een Moeder met twee Kinderen en een Hondje). Zie delpher.nl.
Dubourcq, P.L. (1858) Beschrijving der schilderijen op 's Rijks Museum te Amsterdam met Fac Simile der Naamteekens, Amsterdam: Frans Buffa & Zonen, p. 17, cat.nr. 35 (als Eene Moeder met twee kinderen). Zie Google Boeken.
Dyserinck, Johs. (1891) ‘De schuttersmaaltijd van Bartholomeus van der Helst’, De Gids, jrg. 55, p. 381-430. Zie dbnl.org.

Paintings in the collection of the Rijksmuseum
1664 paintings
de Geer
Group portraits by Dutch artists